Liptena praestans is a butterfly in the family Lycaenidae. It is found in Cameroon, the Republic of the Congo, the Democratic Republic of the Congo, Uganda, Tanzania, Zambia and possibly Sierra Leone and Ivory Coast.

Subspecies
 Liptena praestans praestans (Sierra Leone to Ivory Coast)
 Liptena praestans congoensis Schultze, 1923 (southern Cameroon, Congo, Uganda, north-western Tanzania, north-western Zambia, Democratic Republic of the Congo: Kinshasa, Equateur, Tshuapa, Haut-Uele, Kivu, Sankuru and Lualaba)

References

Butterflies described in 1901
Liptena